Norbert Keßlau (born 13 July 1962 in Dortmund) is a German rower.

References 

 
 

1962 births
Living people
Sportspeople from Dortmund
Rowers at the 1984 Summer Olympics
Rowers at the 1988 Summer Olympics
Olympic bronze medalists for West Germany
Olympic rowers of West Germany
Olympic medalists in rowing
West German male rowers
World Rowing Championships medalists for West Germany
Medalists at the 1988 Summer Olympics